The Potez 4E is a French air-cooled flat-four piston engine of the 1960s.  It was unveiled at the 1959 Paris Air Show, entered production in 1960 and is rated at 78 kW (105 hp).  It remained in production until 1965 when Potez abandoned production of aero-engines.

Variants
4E-00
4E-02
4E-20

4E-30
Fuel injected.

Applications
Chasle Tourbillon
Dabos JD.24P D'Artagnan
Godbille JG.1B
Merville D.63
Piel Emeraude
Pottier P.60 Minacro
Jodel DR1050 Excellence
SAN Jodel D.150 Mascaret
Starck AS-27 Starcky

Specifications (Potez 4E-20)

References

 Aero Engines 1960". Flight, 18 March 1960, pp. 367–387.
 Aero Engines: A "Flight International" Survey". Flight International, 7 January 1965, pp. 19–34.
 Taylor, John W. R. Jane's All The World's Aircraft 1965-66. London: Samson Low, Marston, 1965.

4E
1950s aircraft piston engines